Sarah Emily Warner is a Judge of the Kansas Court of Appeals.

Education and legal career

Warner graduated in 2003 with honors and distinction from the University of Kansas, majoring in French, international studies, mathematics, and political science. She graduated magna cum laude from the Ave Maria School of Law in 2006. After graduating law school, she served as a law clerk to Chief Justice Robert E. Davis of the Kansas Supreme Court until 2009. From 2014 to 2019, she has practiced law in Lawrence, becoming a partner in her firm in 2014.

Appointment to Kansas  Court of Appeals

On April 30, 2019, Governor Laura Kelly appointed Warner to be a Judge of the Kansas Court of Appeals to the seat vacated by retirement of Judge Patrick McAnany. On May 14, 2019, her nomination was submitted to the Kansas Senate. Governor Kelly's first nominee, Judge Jeffry Jack was rejected by the Senate. On May 28, 2019, she was voted out of committee by a 10–0 vote. She was confirmed by the Kansas Senate on May 29, 2019 and sworn into office on August 8, 2019.

References

External links
Official Biography on Kansas Judicial Branch website

Living people
Year of birth missing (living people)
Place of birth missing (living people)
21st-century American women lawyers
21st-century American lawyers
21st-century American judges
Ave Maria School of Law alumni
Kansas Court of Appeals Judges
Kansas lawyers
University of Kansas alumni
21st-century American women judges